The 1997 Biathlon Junior World Championships was held in Forni Avoltri, Italy from February 15 to February 23, 1997. There was to be a total of 8 competitions: sprint, individual, team and relay races for men and women.

Medal winners

Junior Women

Junior Men

Medal table

References 

 IBU Biathlon Guide

Biathlon Junior World Championships
1997 in biathlon
1997 in Italian sport
International sports competitions hosted by Italy
1997 in youth sport